"You Want Me" is a song by English rapper and producer Tom Zanetti.

Music video
The music video features Zanetti arriving at a pool party in a mansion in a Rolls-Royce. The video features cameo appearances from many Ex on the Beach contestants, most notably Dapper Laughs, Ashley Cain and Chloe Khan.

Personnel 
Credits adapted from Tidal.

 Nick Hannam – producer, engineer, programmer
 Tom Zanetti – producer, composer, lyricist, associated performer, programmer, vocal
 Darren Martyn – composer, lyricist
 Sadie Ama – associated performer, featured artist, vocal
 Glen Nicholls – mastering engineer
 Joe Hirst – mixing engineer

Commercial performance
On 25 November 2016, the song entered the UK Singles Chart top 40 at number 34 and has since peaked at number 22.

Charts

Release history

References

2016 songs
2016 singles
Sony Music singles
British house music songs